The Ngas people (also known as the Agas and Angas) are an ethnic group in Plateau State Nigeria. They speak an Afro-asiatic languaged called Ngas. Recent studies have indicated there are roughly 727,000 Ngas people in Nigeria today.

History
According to local folklore, the Angas migrated from Bornu passing through villages before settling on the highlands of Plateau State. In the course of migration, the groups splintered into sub-groups settling in Pankshin, Ampang, Amper and Kabwir districts. The settlers at Kabwir were led by a chief called Gwallam and the chief of the Ampers was Kendim. Later settlements populated the highlands of the Jos Plateau.

Festival
The Ngas celebrate a major festival called the Tsafi Tar or Mos Tar, during the celebration, a brief event called Shooting the Moon takes places to mark the end season and the beginning of a new season. The festival is usually celebrated during the time of harvest.

Settlement
The Ngas who predominantly live on the lowlands and the Southeastern edge of the Jos Plateau are the largest group in the Jos highlands. The major city is Pankshin. The soil of the plains of Amper are littered with granite and farmers in the district grow crops on terraced fields to plant cereal crops such as millet, guinea corn and maize. The people used the granite boulders as foundations and walls for their houses.

References

Sources

Ethnic groups in Nigeria